Srinivasa Kalyanam is a 1987 Telugu-language romance film directed by Kodi Ramakrishna. It stars Venkatesh, Bhanupriya, Gautami, and Mohan Babu  and music composed by K. V. Mahadevan. The film was produced by K. Murari under the Yuva Chitra Arts banner. The film was a Super Hit at the box office.

Plot
Srinivas (Venkatesh) an educated unemployed guy and his sister Lakshmi (Varalakshmi) lost their parents in childhood for saving a landlord Sridhar Rao (Vankayala) and stay with their uncle Nagayah (Suthi Velu), who is a chronic drinker, who takes out all money given by Sridhar Rao and sells them. Srinivas's cousin Saroja (Gautami), daughter of Nagayah helps them to get away from that place and she stays back. They are adopted by a couple (Gollapudi Maruthi Rao and Y. Vijaya) in the city. Srinivas does all kinds of jobs like newspaper delivery boy, auto driver and runs a dance school, where he gets introduced to Lalitha (Bhanupriya), who will be looking for a job staying at the house of her sister (Anitha) and her brother-in-law Yenimdakula Venkatrao (Prasad Babu), who is a bad person. Srinivas gives Lalitha a job in his dance school and both of them fall in love. Meanwhile, Saroja changes her name to Swapna and comes to rent Srinivas' house not knowing that he's her cousin.

Bokka Lambodharam (Mohan Babu), the proprietor of a 5-star hotel, is a big womanizer. Incidentally, Srinivas' uncle Nagayya works as an assistant to him as Nisachara. He sees Lalitha in a dance program and is attracted to her. After a few days, Swapna knows the truth, which restarts her childhood love with Srinivas. At the same time, Bokka Lambodharam traps Lalitha's brother-in-law Venkatrao to get her. To protect her, Srinivas brings her home and tells her that he wants to marry her. After hearing that, Swapna sacrifices her love; while they are making marriage arrangements, Lalitha also knows the truth and decides to go away by accompanying Swapna with Srinivas. She takes the help of Bokka Lambodharam to stop the marriage, he agrees to that if she accepts his condition. Meanwhile, Swapna listens to everything and goes in place of Lalitha. Now Lalitha reveals the truth to Srinivas that Swapna is only Saroja, even Nagayah also recognizes his daughter. Srinivas goes and protects Swapna. Finally, Swapna/Saroja makes the marriage of Srinivas and Lalitha and she also stays along with them.

Cast

Venkatesh as Srinivas
Bhanupriya as Lalitha
Gautami as Swapna / Saroja
Mohan Babu as Bokka Lambodharam
Gollapudi Maruthi Rao
Suthi Velu as Nagayya / Nisachara
Prasad Babu as Yenimdakula Venkatrao
Subhalekha Sudhakar as Rajesh
Vankayala Satyanarayana as Sridhar Rao
Bhimeswara Rao as Narasimham
Gadiraju Subba Rao
Varalakshmi as Lakshmi
Srilakshmi
Mamatha as item number
Anitha as Lalitha's Sister
Kalpana Rai as Sukumari
Y. Vijaya

Soundtrack

Music composed by K. V. Mahadevan. Music released on Lahari Music Company.

Others
 VCDs & DVDs on - VOLGA Videos, Hyderabad

References

External links

1987 films
Films directed by Kodi Ramakrishna
Films scored by K. V. Mahadevan
1980s Telugu-language films